The January 2017 Telekom Cup was the 8th edition of the Telekom Cup, a football friendly tournament organized by Deutsche Telekom, who is also the sponsor. It was hosted by Fortuna Düsseldorf at the ESPRIT arena in Düsseldorf, on 14 January 2017. Alongside the hosts, Mainz 05, Borussia Mönchengladbach, and Bayern Munich also took part.

Overview

Participants

Bracket

Matches
All matches lasted for just 45 minutes. If a match was level after normal time then a penalty shoot-out was played to decide who advanced.

Semi-finals

Third place play-off

Final

Goalscorers

References

External links

German football friendly trophies
2016–17 in German football
Sport in Düsseldorf
January 2017 sports events in Germany
2010s in Düsseldorf